The Majlis Ghorfat Umm Al Sheif is the preserved summerhouse, or majlis, of the former Ruler of Dubai, United Arab Emirates, Sheikh Rashid bin Saeed Al Maktoum. Located in the Dubai suburb of Jumeirah 2, the majlis is preserved today as a heritage site. 

Constructed in 1955, the majlis was named after a pearl fishery of the same name. The majlis was at the time located far from the town of Dubai, in a date palm plantation near to a fishing village. It was built from a mixture of adobe, gypsum and coral with timber. The roof terrace of the majlis was used to both dry dates and provide a cool open air sleeping platform. The majlis was fully restored in 1994.

The restoration of the majlis included the construction of a small garden with date palms and a traditional aflaj irrigation system. It is now managed by Dubai Culture & Arts Authority and is a small but popular tourist destination.

The opening hours of the Majlis Ghorfat Umm Al Sheif are Sunday to Thursday 07:30 – 14:30. it is closed on Friday & Saturday.

See also
 List of buildings in Dubai

References 

Buildings and structures in Dubai